Rik Coolsaet is a Belgian academic. He is professor emeritus of International Relations at Ghent University (Belgium) and Senior Associate Fellow at Egmont Institute (Royal Institute for International Relations), Brussels.

Coolsaet was invited to join the original European Commission Expert Group on Violent Radicalisation (established 2006) and the subsequent European Network of Experts on Radicalisation (ENER).

Official positions
He has held several high-ranking official positions, such as deputy chief of the Cabinet of the Belgian Minister of Defence Guy Coeme and deputy chief of the Cabinet of the Minister of Foreign Affairs Willy Claes (1992–1995) where he was in charge for the contacts with the USA regarding the Rwandan genocide. From 2002 until 2009 he served as Director of the "Security & Global Governance" program at the Egmont Institute in Brussels.

Publications
Coolsaet's research focuses on Belgian foreign policy, terrorism and radicalisation, security studies, and international relations.

In 1998, he published a comprehensive study on the history of Belgian foreign policy ("Belgium and its foreign policy 1830–1990", in Dutch and partly in French). The latest revised edition, released in September 2014, pursues this history until 2014 (published only in Dutch). Two other studies on Belgian foreign policy deal with Dutch-Belgian bilateral relations since 1945 (Nederland-België. De Belgisch-Nederlandse betrekkingen vanaf 1940, Boom, 2011, with Duco Hellema and Bart Stol) and with the history of the Ministry of Foreign Affairs: Les Affaires étrangères au service de l’Etat belge, de 1830 à nos jours (Mardaga, 2014) and, in Dutch, Buitenlandse Zaken in België. Geschiedenis van een ministerie, zijn diplomaten en zijn consuls van 1830 tot vandaag (Lannoo, 2014), with Vincent Dujardin and late Claude Roosens.

He was appointed a member of the original European Commission’s Expert Group on Violent Radicalisation (established 2006) and the subsequent European Network of Experts on Radicalisation (ENER). Since 2003, he has been coordinating research on terrorism and radicalisation, which has resulted in several publications. Jihadi Terrorism and the Radicalisation Challenge. European and American Experiences was published by Ashgate in 2011. This volume was included in the 2012 "Top 150 Books on Terrorism and Counterterrorism", established by the academic journal Perspectives on Terrorism. His analysis on the impact of 9/11 on Europe was published in 2013 in a volume edited by Mohammed Ayoob and Etga Ugur of Michigan State University ("Europe: Reinforcing Existing Trends", in: Assessing the War on Terror. Lynne Rienner, 2013, pp. 137–159). Recent studies on radicalisation and terrorism have been released by the Brussels-based Egmont Institute: Returnees – Who are they, why are they (not) coming back and how should we deal with them ? Assessing policies on returning Foreign Terrorist Fighters in Belgium, Germany and the Netherlands (with Thomas Renard, February 2018); Anticipating the post-Daesh landscape (October 2017); ‘All Radicalisation is Local’. The genesis and drawbacks of an elusive concept (June 2016); Facing the fourth foreign fighters wave. What drives Europeans to Syria, and to Islamic State? Insights from the Belgian case (March 2016).

Coolsaet has also written extensively on international relations, mostly in Dutch. Between 2005 and 2016, his Macht en Waarden in de Wereldpolitiek ("Power and Values in World Politics", Academia Press) provided for a yearly overview of major trends in global politics. A 2008 publication, De geschiedenis van de wereld van morgen ("A History of Tomorrow’s World", Van Halewyck), analyzed long-term change patterns in international relations. Upon publication in February 2008, this book appeared on the Belgian bookshops' bestseller list for several months.

Bibliography

References

Further reading

External links 
 
 
 "Rik Coolsaet". Egmont Institute. Retrieved October 31, 2016.
 Hasan, Mehdi. What drives youngsters to Syria?. Huffington Post UK. Retrieved October 31, 2016.

Academic staff of Ghent University
Living people
Year of birth missing (living people)
Flemish academics